The following outline is provided as an overview of and topical guide to Libya:

Libya – country in the Maghreb region of North Africa bordered by the Mediterranean Sea to the north, Egypt to the east, Sudan to the southeast, Chad and Niger to the south, and Algeria and Tunisia to the west.

General reference 

 Pronunciation: 
 Common English country name:  Libya
 Official English country name:  Libya, or Libyan Republic
 Common endonym(s):  
 Official endonym(s):  
 Adjectival(s): Libyan
 Demonym(s):
 Etymology: Name of Libya
 International rankings of Libya
 ISO country codes:  LY, LBY, 434
 ISO region codes:  See ISO 3166-2:LY
 Internet country code top-level domain:  .ly

Geography of Libya 

Geography of Libya
 Libya is: a country
 Location
 Libya is situated within the following regions:
 Northern Hemisphere and Eastern Hemisphere
 Africa
 North Africa
 Sahara Desert
 Greater Middle East
 Time zone:  Central Africa Time (UTC+02)
 Extreme points of Libya
 High:  Bikku Bitti 
 Low:  Sabkhat Ghuzayyil 
 Land boundaries:  4,348 km
 1,115 km
 1,055 km
 982 km
 459 km
 383 km
 354 km
 Coastline:  Mediterranean Sea 1,770 km
 Population of Libya: 6,160,000  - 102nd most populous country

 Area of Libya: 1,759,541 km2
 Atlas of Libya

Environment of Libya 

Environment of Libya
 Climate of Libya
 Environmental issues in Libya
 Ecoregions in Libya
 Protected areas of Libya
 National parks of Libya
 Wildlife of Libya
 Flora of Libya
 Fauna of Libya
 Birds of Libya
 Mammals of Libya

Natural geographic features of Libya 

 Glaciers in Libya: none
 Mountains of Libya
 Volcanoes in Libya
 Rivers of Libya
 World Heritage Sites in Libya

Regions of Libya 

Regions of Libya

Ecoregions of Libya 

List of ecoregions in Libya

Administrative divisions of Libya 

Administrative divisions of Libya
 Districts of Libya

Districts of Libya 

Districts of Libya
 Capital of Libya: Tripoli
 Cities of Libya

Demography of Libya 

Demographics of Libya

Government and politics of Libya 

Politics of Libya
 Form of government:
 Capital of Libya: Tripoli
 Elections in Libya
 Political parties in Libya

Branches of the government of Libya 

Government of Libya

Executive branch of the government of Libya 
 Head of state: President of Libya,
 Head of government: Prime Minister of Libya,
 Cabinet of Libya

Legislative branch of the government of Libya 

 Council of Deputies (unicameral)

Judicial branch of the government of Libya 

Court system of Libya

Foreign relations of Libya 

Foreign relations of Libya
 Diplomatic missions in Libya
 Diplomatic missions of Libya

International organization membership 
Libya is a member of:

African Development Bank Group (AfDB)
African Union (AU)
African Union/United Nations Hybrid operation in Darfur (UNAMID)
Arab Bank for Economic Development in Africa (ABEDA)
Arab Fund for Economic and Social Development (AFESD)
Arab Maghreb Union (AMU)
Arab Monetary Fund (AMF)
Common Market for Eastern and Southern Africa (COMESA)
Council of Arab Economic Unity (CAEU)
Food and Agriculture Organization (FAO)
Group of 77 (G77)
International Atomic Energy Agency (IAEA)
International Bank for Reconstruction and Development (IBRD)
International Civil Aviation Organization (ICAO)
International Criminal Police Organization (Interpol)
International Development Association (IDA)
International Federation of Red Cross and Red Crescent Societies (IFRCS)
International Finance Corporation (IFC)
International Fund for Agricultural Development (IFAD)
International Labour Organization (ILO)
International Maritime Organization (IMO)
International Mobile Satellite Organization (IMSO)
International Monetary Fund (IMF)
International Olympic Committee (IOC)
International Organization for Migration (IOM)
International Organization for Standardization (ISO)

International Red Cross and Red Crescent Movement (ICRM)
International Telecommunication Union (ITU)
International Telecommunications Satellite Organization (ITSO)
Inter-Parliamentary Union (IPU)
Islamic Development Bank (IDB)
League of Arab States (LAS)
Multilateral Investment Guarantee Agency (MIGA)
Nonaligned Movement (NAM)
Organisation of Islamic Cooperation (OIC)
Organisation for the Prohibition of Chemical Weapons (OPCW)
Organization of Arab Petroleum Exporting Countries (OAPEC)
Organization of Petroleum Exporting Countries (OPEC)
Permanent Court of Arbitration (PCA)
United Nations (UN)
United Nations Conference on Trade and Development (UNCTAD)
United Nations Educational, Scientific, and Cultural Organization (UNESCO)
United Nations Industrial Development Organization (UNIDO)
Universal Postal Union (UPU)
World Confederation of Labour (WCL)
World Customs Organization (WCO)
World Federation of Trade Unions (WFTU)
World Health Organization (WHO)
World Intellectual Property Organization (WIPO)
World Meteorological Organization (WMO)
World Tourism Organization (UNWTO)
World Trade Organization (WTO) (observer)

Law and order in Libya 

Law of Libya
 Constitution of Libya
 Law Enforcement in Libya
 Human rights in Libya
 LGBT rights in Libya

Military of Libya 

Military of Libya
 Command
 Commander-in-chief:
 Forces
 Army of Libya
 Navy of Libya
 Air Force of Libya
 Military history of Libya

Local government in Libya 

Local government in Libya

History of Libya 

History of Libya
Current events of Libya

History of Libya by period 
 Prehistory of Libya
 Ancient Libya (before 146 BC)
 Roman Libya (146 BC – 640 AD)
 History of Islamic Tripolitania and Cyrenaica (Arab rule) (640–1551)
 Ottoman Tripolitania (1551–1911)
 History of Libya as Italian colony (1911–1934)
 Italian Libya (1934–1943)
 Allied occupation of Libya (1943–1951)
 Kingdom of Libya (1951–1969)
 History of Libya under Muammar Gaddafi (1969–2011)
 Libyan civil war (2011)
 Timeline of the 2011 Libyan civil war
 2011 military intervention in Libya
 United Nations Security Council Resolution 1973
 International reactions to the 2011 military intervention in Libya
 Battle of Sirte (2011)
 Death of Muammar Gaddafi
 International reactions to the death of Muammar Gaddafi
 Libya in transition (2011–)
 National Transitional Council

History of Libya by subject 
 Military history of Libya
 List of heads of government of Libya

Culture of Libya 

Culture of Libya
 Cuisine of Libya
 Languages of Libya
 Media in Libya
 National symbols of Libya
 Coat of arms of Libya
 Flag of Libya
 National anthem of Libya
 Public holidays in Libya
 Religion in Libya
 Buddhism in Libya
 Christianity in Libya
 Hinduism in Libya
 Islam in Libya
 Judaism in Libya
 World Heritage Sites in Libya

Art in Libya 
 Literature of Libya
 Music of Libya
 Television in Libya

Sports in Libya 

Sports in Libya
 Football in Libya
 Libya at the Olympics

Economy and infrastructure of Libya

Economy of Libya
 Economic rank, by nominal GDP (2007): 62nd (sixty-second)
 Agriculture in Libya
 Communications in Libya
 Internet in Libya
 Companies of Libya
Currency of Libya: Dinar
ISO 4217: LYD
 Energy in Libya
 Health care in Libya
 Mining in Libya
 Tourism in Libya
 Transport in Libya
 Airports in Libya
 Rail transport in Libya

Education in Libya 

Education in Libya

Health in Libya 

Health in Libya

See also 

Libya
Index of Libya-related articles
List of international rankings
List of Libya-related topics
Member state of the United Nations
Outline of Africa
Outline of geography

References

External links 

Libyan Embassy Washington D.C.
General People's Committee (The Cabinet)
The People's Committee of Foreign Affairs
 A Window to Libya by Tarek Alwan
Worldstatesmen.org's History and list of rulers of Tripolitania, Cyrenaica, Fezzan and Libya (before and after unification).
 Libyan People's Bureau (Libyan Embassy), London - UK
Libyan People's Bureau (Libyan Embassy), Ottawa
Libyan Cultural Affairs, London.
Libyan American Chamber of Commerce

Limes Tripolitanus
 20 digital objects in The European Library
Libya Directory
Libyan great jamahirya website
gaddafi & libya Info(South korea)

.
Libya